John Augustus George Ryrie (21 December 1886 – 1 June 1927) was a two-time Australian national champion rower who represented for Australasia at the 1912 Summer Olympics.

Rowing career
Jack Ryrie's father was John Cassels Ryrie a pastoralist from Trangie in central northern New South Wales. Jack was educated at The King's School in Sydney where he distinguished himself in his studies as well as in the sporting fields of cricket, rowing and football. His senior club rowing was from the Sydney Rowing Club. He was a member of the New South Wales eight which won the 1908 Australian Interstate Championship, the first time in 15 years his state had won the title. He repeated this feat again in 1911, rowing in the bow of the victorious New South Wales eight.

The following year he was a member of the Australasian eight which represented at the 1912 Summer Olympics in Stockholm. In the first round they beat a Swedish boat by two lengths, but in the next round they were up against the Leander Club from Great Britain and lost by half a length. The overseas tour wasn't totally a loss as before the Olympics, he was part of the Sydney Rowing Club eight which won the 1912 Grand Challenge Cup at the Henley Royal Regatta. In that victory they beat the same Leander eight who knocked them out of the Olympic regatta a few weeks later.

War service and death
In January 1915, he went to England to enlist and joined the 4th Staffordshire Regiment, he saw active service and was wounded while in France. After recovering he was commissioned into the Machine Gun Corps and served in Palestine. At war's end he returned to Australia.

On 1 June 1927, playing polo at the Gilgandra carnival, he cut across two players while riding hard for the ball. He crashed into both of them and fell heavily breaking his neck and died instantly. He left behind a wife and three young daughters.

References

1886 births
1927 deaths
Australian male rowers
Olympic rowers of Australasia
Rowers at the 1912 Summer Olympics
People educated at The King's School, Parramatta
Australian soldiers
Australian military personnel of World War I